Scopula natalica is a moth of the family Geometridae. It was described by Arthur Gardiner Butler in 1875. It is found in Cameroon, Kenya, Malawi, Sierra Leone, South Africa, Sudan, Tanzania and Zambia.

References

Moths described in 1875
natalica
Moths of Africa
Taxa named by Arthur Gardiner Butler